Even the River Runs is the debut studio album by American country music artist Joel Crouse. It was released on August 19, 2014 via Show Dog-Universal Music. The album includes the singles "If You Want Some", "Why God Made Love Songs" and "Don't Tell Me".

Critical reception
A review at amazon.com said that Even the River Runs is a remearkable 10-song collection that highlights Crouse's prowess as had a hand in writing every song on the project.

Track listing

Chart performance

References

2014 debut albums
Joel Crouse albums
Show Dog-Universal Music albums